The Hellenic Basketball Federation (abbreviated as Ε.Ο.Κ.) is the main basketball governing body for the sport in Greece. It directs and oversees all of the national basketball teams of Greece, including both the junior and senior national teams, of both men and women. From 1969 to 1992, the E.O.K. also solely oversaw the top-tier level men's Greek National Basketball League, before its basic operation was taken over by HEBA, starting with the 1992–93 basketball season.

Competitions organized
The E.O.K. organizes numerous club and national team competitions. Among them are:

Club competitions
Men's Greek Cup
Greek Men’s Super Cup
Men's Greek 2nd Division
Men's 3rd Division
Men's 4th Division
Women's Greek League 
Women's Greek 2nd Division
Women's Greek Cup

National team competitions
Acropolis International Tournament

National team honours

Men's National Team
 FIBA World Cup
 Runners-up (1): 2006
 EuroBasket
 Winners (2): 1987, 2005
 Runners-up (1): 1989

Men's U-21
 FIBA Under-21 World Cup
 Runners-up (1): 2005

Men's U-20
 FIBA Europe Under-20 Championship
 Winners (3): 2002, 2009, 2017
 Runners-up (2): 1992, 2010

Men's U-19
 FIBA Under-19 World Cup
 Winners (1): 1995
 Runners-up (1): 2009

Men's U-18
 FIBA Europe Under-18 Championship
 Winners (2): 2008, 2015
 Runners-up (2): 1970, 2007

Men's U-16
 FIBA Europe Under-16 Championship
 Winners (2): 1989, 1993
 Runners-up (3): 1975, 1991, 1999

See also
Greek Basket League
Greek A2 Basket League
Greek B Basket League
Greek C Basket League
Greek Cup
Greek Women's League
Greek Women's Cup
Acropolis International Basketball Tournament
Greek Men National Basketball Team
Greek Women National Basketball Team
Greek Men National Basketball Team B
Greek Men Under-21 National Basketball Team
Greek Men Under-20 National Basketball Team
Greek Men Under-19 and Under-18 National Basketball Team
Greek Men Under-17 National Basketball Team
Greek Men Under-16 National Basketball Team

External links
Official website 
Greece at FIBA site

Basketball in Greece
Basketball governing bodies in Europe
Bas
Sports organizations established in 1932